The Homeland Security Subcommittee on Border Security and Enforcement is a subcommittee within the House Homeland Security Committee. Between 2019 and 2023, it was known as Homeland Security Subcommittee on Border Security, Facilitation and Operations.

Members, 118th Congress

Historical membership rosters

115th Congress

116th Congress

117th Congress

External links 
 Official Site

Homeland Border Security